Warren Stewart Way (January 19, 1911 – May 5, 1980) was an American college basketball coach. He was the head coach and a longtime assistant at Marshall. While at Marshall, Way was named acting head coach in 1969 after head coach Ellis T. Johnson resigned and Marshall was subsequently suspended from the Mid-American Conference due to alleged recruiting violations. A year later he was named the school's full time head coach.

Way became the associate head coach at Marshall under Carl Tacy in 1971 after Way made the request to athletic director Joe McMullen. Way would remain the associate head coach at Marshall until 1975 when he retired from coaching. Prior to his tenure at Marshall, Way was the head coach at Ceredo-Kenova High School, Scott High School, and Huntington High School in West Virginia.

Way died of cancer on May 5, 1980.

Head coaching record

References

1911 births
1980 deaths
Basketball coaches from West Virginia
College men's basketball head coaches in the United States
Deaths from cancer in West Virginia
Georgetown College (Kentucky) alumni
High school basketball coaches in West Virginia
Marshall Thundering Herd men's basketball coaches
People from Wayne County, West Virginia
Sportspeople from Huntington, West Virginia